Jaleh or Jeleh may refer to:
 Jaleh, Aligudarz
 Jaleh, Dorud

See also
 Jale (disambiguation)